South Kurzeme Municipality is one of the 35 municipalities established in Latvia in 2021. It surrounds Liepāja, Latvia's third largest city. Its first elected municipal council will take office on 1 July 2021. Its seat is at Grobiņa.

Geography

It is located in the southwestern part of the Courland region in western Latvia, on the coast of the Baltic Sea. It borders Ventspils Municipality to the north, Kuldīga Municipality to the northeast, and Saldus Municipality to the east. It surrounds the port city of Liepāja in the west. It also borders the Lithuanian counties of Klaipėda and Telšiai to the south and southeast respectively. The westernmost point of Latvia is located at Cape Bernāti in Nīca Parish south of Liepāja.

Erosion of the coast north of Liepāja has been accelerated because breakwaters at Liepāja's seaport intercept sand drifting northward along the coast. The coast south of Liepāja features sandy beaches and dunes, behind which are lagoons and marshy plains.

The Saka drains into the Baltic Sea at Pāvilosta.

Grīņu Nature Reserve is located in the northern part of the municipality.

History
South Kurzeme Municipality corresponds in extent to the former Liepāja District as it existed from 1991 to 2009. In the 2009 territorial reforms, Liepāja District was divided into the municipalities of Aizpute, Durbe, Grobiņa, Nīca, Pāvilosta, Priekule, Rucava, and Vaiņode. In 2020, the Saeima approved reducing the number of administrative divisions at the municipal level from 119 to 42, including rejoining the aforementioned municipalities to form South Kurzeme Municipality. Elections for Latvia's new municipal councils were held on 5 June 2021, and the new municipalities including South Kurzeme will go into effect on 1 July 2021.

Administration
The municipal council of South Kurzeme currently comprises 19 councillors. The municipality is to form joint authorities with the city of Liepāja for the administration of civil protection, education, and waste management.

The municipality is subdivided into five towns and 26 parishes:

Towns
Aizpute 
Durbe
Grobiņa
Pāvilosta
Priekule
Parishes
Aizpute Parish
Bārta Parish
Bunka Parish
Cīrava Parish
Dunalka Parish
Dunika Parish
Durbe Parish
Embūte Parish
Gavieze Parish
Gramzda Parish
Grobiņa Parish
Kalēti Parish
Kalvene Parish
Kazdanga Parish
Laža Parish
Medze Parish
Nīca Parish
Otaņķi Parish
Priekule Parish
Rucava Parish
Saka Parish
Tadaiķi Parish
Vaiņode Parish
Vecpils Parish
Vērgale Parish
Virga Parish

Demographics
The Central Statistical Bureau of Latvia estimated a population of 33,364 living in what is now South Kurzeme Municipality at the beginning of 2021. This represented a 28% decrease from an estimated population of 46,451 at the beginning of 2000, and a 13% decrease from an estimated population of 38,351 at the beginning of 2011.

The municipal seat of Grobiņa had an estimated population of 3522 at the beginning of 2021. The largest town in the district is Aizpute, with an estimated population of 4036 at the beginning of 2021.

Economy and infrastructure
Significant economic activities in South Kurzeme Municipality include tourism, agriculture, forestry and fishing. The municipality is served by national roads A9, which connects Liepāja to Riga, and A11, which runs from Liepāja to the Lithuanian border crossing near Rucava. The Jelgava–Liepāja Railway runs east to west through the municipality. Liepāja International Airport is located in South Kurzeme Municipality at Cimdenieki just east of Liepāja.

References

 
Municipalities of Latvia
2021 establishments in Latvia
States and territories established in 2021